= TC-2216 =

Chemical compound

Identifiers
- IUPAC name: 8-pyridin-3-yl-1,8-diazaspiro[4.4]nonane
- CAS Number: 646055-67-6
- PubChem CID: 10176607
- ChemSpider: 8352112
- UNII: J2T94PE2HD
- CompTox Dashboard (EPA): DTXSID00436446

Chemical and physical data
- Formula: C_{12}H_{17}N_{3}
- Molar mass: 203.289 g·mol^{−1}
- 3D model (JSmol): Interactive image
- SMILES: N1CCCC1(CC2)CN2c3cnccc3
- InChI: InChI=1S/C12H17N3/c1-3-11(9-13-6-1)15-8-5-12(10-15)4-2-7-14-12/h1,3,6,9,14H,2,4-5,7-8,10H2; Key:NXIPMBQVNTWEEX-UHFFFAOYSA-N

TC-2216 is a drug developed by Targacept which acts as a partial agonist at neural nicotinic acetylcholine receptors and was researched for the treatment of anxiety and depression. It was unsuccessful as a therapeutic but is still used in pharmacological research as an alpha4beta2-selective antagonist.
